Uvelsky District is an administrative and municipal district (raion), one of the twenty-seven in Chelyabinsk Oblast, Russia. It is located in the eastern central part of the oblast. Its administrative center is the rural locality (a settlement) of Uvelsky. Population:  32,188 (2002 Census);  The population of the administrative center accounts for 33.0% of the district's total population.

References

Notes

Sources

Districts of Chelyabinsk Oblast